The 1936 Boston Bees season was the 66th season of the franchise. The team finished sixth in the National League with a record of 71–83, 21 games behind the New York Giants. This was their first season under the nickname of Bees, which they would keep until 1940.

Offseason 
Near the end of the debacle of the 1935 season, Emil Fuchs gave up his share of the team and retired. Major League Baseball took control of the team to finish out the season and then sold it before the 1936 season began. The new owners put advertisements in the paper asking the public to come up with a new name for the team. Thus, the Boston Bees were born and the team's ballpark was renamed "The Bee Hive."

Notable transactions 
 December 12, 1935: Ed Brandt and Randy Moore were traded by the Braves to the Brooklyn Dodgers for Tony Cuccinello, Ray Benge, Al López, and Bobby Reis.

Regular season

Season standings

Record vs. opponents

Roster

Player stats

Batting

Starters by position 
Note: Pos = Position; G = Games played; AB = At bats; H = Hits; Avg. = Batting average; HR = Home runs; RBI = Runs batted in

Other batters 
Note: G = Games played; AB = At bats; H = Hits; Avg. = Batting average; HR = Home runs; RBI = Runs batted in

Pitching

Starting pitchers 
Note: G = Games pitched; IP = Innings pitched; W = Wins; L = Losses; ERA = Earned run average; SO = Strikeouts

Other pitchers 
Note: G = Games pitched; IP = Innings pitched; W = Wins; L = Losses; ERA = Earned run average; SO = Strikeouts

Relief pitchers 
Note: G = Games pitched; W = Wins; L = Losses; SV = Saves; ERA = Earned run average; SO = Strikeouts

Farm system

Notes

References 
1936 Boston Braves season at Baseball Reference

Boston Bees seasons
Boston Bees
Boston Bees
1930s in Boston